Tosca D'Aquino (born 10 June 1966) is an Italian actress, comedian and television presenter.

Life and career 
Born in Naples, Tosca D'Aquino started her career at 15 years old, appearing in several local television shows. At nineteen years old she moved in Rome to pursue an acting career, and there she enrolled at  the Accademia Nazionale di Arte Drammatica Silvio D'Amico. In 1986 she was cast in the popular Saturday night show Fantastico, then in 1988 she made her film debut in Rimini Rimini - Un anno dopo. While being quite active in films, usually in comedic roles, her popularity is mainly linked to television, notably to the RAI Saturday night show Torno Sabato, she co-hosted alongside Giorgio Panariello in the early 2000s.

Selected filmography 
 Scugnizzi (1989)
 Paganini (1989)
 Captain Fracassa's Journey (1990)
 Black Holes (1995)
 The Graduates (1995)
 The Cyclone (1996)
 Il cielo in una stanza (1999)
 Padre Pio: Miracle Man (2000)
 John XXIII: The Pope of Peace (2002)
 Christmas in Love (2004) 
 Torno a vivere da solo (2008)
 Amore che vieni, amore che vai (2008)
 Ex 2: Still Friends? (2011)
 Anita Garibaldi (2012)
 Buona giornata (2012)

References

External links 
 
 

Italian film actresses
Italian television actresses
Italian stage actresses
1966 births
Mass media people from Naples
Living people
Italian comedians
Accademia Nazionale di Arte Drammatica Silvio D'Amico alumni
Italian television presenters
Italian women television presenters